The Children is a three-part thriller first shown on ITV on 1 September 2008. Starring Kevin Whately and Geraldine Somerville, and written by Lucy Gannon, the story focuses on the murder of an eight-year-old girl, who is found on the patio of her home, and the subsequent investigation to discover which one of the adults who cared for her could have killed her. The series was released on DVD on 26 December 2008.

Plot
The series centres on the dysfunctional lives of Cameron, Sue, Sue's daughter, Emily, Sue's ex-husband and DJ Paul, his new girlfriend Natasha, Cameron's ex-wife Anne and their son Jack. The main plot follows Cameron's family life at home, dealing with life living as a step family. The plot is told in a backwards flashback mode. Arguments and tensions rise throughout the story, and eventually, following her strange and naughty behaviour, little Emily is killed. Any one of the adults could have been responsible – and were all placed at the scene.

As the plot reaches its climax, Cameron is shown hitting Emily and accidentally smashing her through a glass patio door, however there is a twist to the tale as all the suspects are then seen killing her one by one – all except one of them. Natasha, the only character not seen killing Emily, is seen crying and sobbing whilst shouting "I'm sorry". This scene was particularly disliked by some critics, because viewers were not shown how or indeed why, or if, Natasha killed her. That, however, said the writer, was the crux of the drama, that any one of them could have, and that her position within her family had become so marginalized that she was, at times, perceived as a nuisance or problem by all of them.

Cast
 Kevin Whately as Cameron Miller
 Geraldine Somerville as Sue Miller
 Ian Puleston-Davies as Paul Sutton
 Lesley Sharp as Anne Miller
 Kate Ashfield as Natasha Sutton
 Freddie Boath as Jack Miller
 Michael Begley as D.S. Bliss
 David Maybrick as D.C.I. Goodier
 Leanne Lakey as D.C. Morton
 Andrew Brooke as P.C. Warrior
 Pascale Burgess as P.C. Cardigan
 Karen Bryson as P.C. Yearsley
 Simon Trinder as P.C. Rook
 Sinead Michael as Emily

Episodes

References

External links

2008 British television series debuts
2008 British television series endings
2000s British drama television series
2000s British crime television series
2000s British television miniseries
English-language television shows
Serial drama television series
ITV television dramas
Television shows set in Hertfordshire